XHTI-FM (branded as La Huasteca) is a  Mexican Spanish-language FM radio station in Tempoal, Veracruz. It is owned by Grupo AS, one of the largest regional Radiorama partners in Mexico.

History
XETI-AM on 1430 kHz received its concession on July 10, 1964. In the 1990s, it moved to 750 kHz which allowed it a major power increase and the ability to begin broadcasting at night, and it migrated to FM in 2010.

References

Radio stations in Veracruz